The Mbeubeuss Landfill, also Mbeubeuss Rubbish Dump, is a solid waste disposal site in Senegal. It is the main solid waste disposal site for the capital city of Dakar, with a projected population of approximately 4 million people, as of 2022, serving the homes, businesses and industries of that metropolis. The landfill hosts an estimated 4,000 scavengers looking for anything recyclable, primarily plastic. The landfill has been in existence since 1968, however the Senegalese authorities propose to shut it down and set up smaller recycling centers instead.

Location
The landfill is located in the neighborhood called Mbeubeuss, in Malika District, in the Pikine Department of the city of Dakar, the national capital and largest city in that country. The geographical coordinates of Mbeubeuss Landfill are 14°48'09.0"N, 17°18'48.0"W (Latitude:14.802500; Longitude:-17.313333).

Overview
Mbeubeuss Landfill was established in 1968. As of 2011 the site received an estimated 1,000 to 2,000 tonnes of solid waste from the city of Dakar on a daily basis.

As of January 2022, an estimated 4,000 people lived and worked in the landfill, scavenging for recyclables including metal, cardboard, electronics, plastic and such. Some sell food and drink to those in the landfill, regardless of the stench.

In 1990, three of the long-time dwellers/workers in the landfill formed and association,"Association Bokk Diom des Récupérateurs et Recycleurs de Mbeubeuss" (Bokk Diom), to advocate for their rights and improve the public perception of their "trade".

Future plans
In 2020, the government of Senegal indicated that it planned to set aside €259 million to rehabilitate the landfill that occupies . Bokk Diom, the local association of trash pickers and recyclers are opposed to closing the landfill or relocation of the dumpsite. Discussions about rehabilitating the landfill and improving the lives of the people who live and work there have gone on for several decades.

See also
 Dandora Waste to Energy Power Station
 Kakamega Waste To Energy Plant
 Pomona Waste To Energy Power Station

References

External links
 “You only see trash. We see a treasure trove”, why waste management in Senegal is a critical step toward sustainability As of 9 March 2020.

Landfills
Dakar